Thomas Kappeler (12. February in 1953; † 30. May in 2022) was a Swiss mathematician and professor at University of Zurich.
Kappeler's main research was in global analysis, partial differential equations and dynamical systems in infinite dimensions.

Kappeler co-founded the Zurich Graduate School in Mathematics, a joint doctoral program of the Mathematics departments of ETH Zurich and University of Zurich. He also actively supported young kids with talent in mathematics. He was the co-leader of the children's math club Junior Euler Society.

Life 
Kappeler studied mathematics at ETH Zurich, where he did his Ph.D. in 1981 under the supervision of Corneliu Constantinescu. He was a visiting professor at the University of California, Berkeley, the University of Pennsylvania, Brandeis University and Brown University. He was a professor at Ohio State University from 1990 till 1996.After that he became a mathematics professor at University of Zurich.

Selected publications 
Kappeler published more than 150 research articles. He also published two books on PDEs.

 
 
 

 
Cohen, D., Costa, A., Farber, M. Kappeler, T. Topology of Random 2-Complexes. Discrete Comput Geom 47, 117–149 (2012). doi: 10.1007/s00454-011-9378-0

Books

Weblinks 
Kappeler in MathSciNet by the American Mathematical Society.

References 

Academic staff of the University of Zurich
20th-century Swiss mathematicians
21st-century Swiss mathematicians
ETH Zurich alumni